Nighthawk, in comics, may refer to:

 Nighthawk (DC Comics)
 Nighthawk (Marvel Comics)
 Night Hawk (comics)

See also
Nighthawk (disambiguation)
Hawk (comics)